We Love Disney is a compilation album and second entry in the eponymous series. It was released in Australia on November 14, 2014.

History
We Love Disney is the second album in the compilation series of the same name. It was released in Australia in November 2014, debuting at 69 on the Australia Album Chart. The album includes such Disney songs as "Let It Go" (from Frozen) and "Baby Mine" (from Dumbo) and such artists as Dannii Minogue and The McClymonts.

Track listing

Charts

References

2014 compilation albums
Universal Music Australia albums